The 2023 SAFF U-19 Championship is the 5th edition of the SAFF U-20 Championship, an international football competition for men's under-20 national teams organized by South Asian Football Federation (SAFF). The host of the tournament yet to finalized. It will held between July to August 2023.

Venue
The venue of the tournament yet to finalized.

Participating teams 
Sri Lanka are ineligible for participation as they are suspended by FIFA. Rest 6 SAFF teams are eligible to participate.

Players eligibility
Players born on or after 1 January 2004 are eligible to compete in the tournament. Each team has to register a squad of minimum 16 players and maximum 23 players, minimum two of whom must be goalkeepers.

See also
2023 SAFF U-17 Championship

References 

2023
2023 in Asian football
2022–23 in Indian football
2022 in Bhutanese football
2022 in Bangladeshi football
2022 in Maldivian football
2022–23 in Sri Lankan football 
2022 in youth association football
SAFF